Peckoltia lineola is a species of catfish in the family Loricariidae. It is native to South America, where it occurs in the basins of the Ventuari River in Venezuela and the Inírida River in Colombia. The species reaches 9.7 cm (3.8 inches) SL and is typically found in rocky riffles. Its specific epithet, lineola, derives from a Latin word meaning "line", referring to the lines present on the species' compound pterotic.

P. lineola appears in the aquarium trade, where it is most frequently referred to either as the shortlined pleco, as the Orinoco dwarf pleco, or by one of three associated L-numbers, which are L-202, LDA-057, and LDA-079.

References 

Fish described in 2008
Ancistrini